John McMorris (born 1970), better known as Little John, is a Jamaican dancehall musician best known for his 1980s recordings.

History
Born 1970 in Kingston, Jamaica, Little John was so called as he began performing and recording at the age of nine. He first recorded for Captain Sinbad's Youth in Progress label (including debut single "51 Storm"), and is regarded by some as the first dancehall singer, known for his ability to create lyrics over any backing track. After getting his break with Sugar Minott's Youth Promotion organisation, he performed with sound systems such as Romantic Hi Fi, Kilimanjaro, Gemini, and Henry "Junjo" Lawes' Volcano Hi Power. He recorded for many producers in the 1980s, notably for Lawes, Joseph Hoo Kim, George Phang, Jah Thomas, and King Jammy. 

He continued to record in the 1990s including the Winston Holness-produced Boombastic (1990), and in the 21st century released the album Build Back Yard (2006). He also continued to perform live, including paying tribute to the late Sugar Minott at Reggae Sumfest in 2010.

Discography
Janet Sinclair (single, 1982), Greensleeves – with Billy Boyo
Reggae Dance (1982), Midnight Rock
Showdown vol. 1 (1984), Empire/Hitbound – with Barry Brown
English Woman (1983), Gorgon
Ghetto Youth (1983), Jah Guidance – reissued (1990), RAS
Give the Youth a Try (1983), Live & Learn
Show Case 83 (1983), EAD
Showdown vol. 6 (1984), Hitbound – with Frankie Paul
True Confession (1984), Power House
Unite (1984), Vista Sounds
Clarks Booty (1985), Live & Love
River to the Bank (1985), Power House
The Best of Little John (1985), RM
Worries and Trouble (1985), Black Scorpio
Rubber Dub One (1986), C&E
Youth of Today (1986), Skengdon
Dance Hall Clash (1986), Sunset – with Uglyman
Warriors & Trouble (1986), World Enterprise
Showcase Volume 1 (198?), Sir Tommy's – with Trevor Junior
Boombastic (1990), Heartbeat
Build Back Yard (2006), Johnhouse

Compilations
Early Days (1984), Jah Bible

References

Jamaican reggae singers
1970 births
Living people
Musicians from Kingston, Jamaica
Heartbeat Records artists